Attorney General Conant may refer to:

Gordon Daniel Conant (1885–1953), Attorney General of Ontario
Sherman Conant (1839–1890), Attorney General of Florida